Lord & Taylor is the oldest surviving department store in the United States, in business since 1826. The brand was acquired by new owner, Saadia Group, and relaunched debuting an entire new look in the fall of 2022.

History

Under the Lord family, 1824–1916
English-born Samuel Lord started a dry goods business in New York City in 1824 and opened the original store that would become Lord & Taylor in 1826, on Catherine Street in what is now Two Bridges, Manhattan. The shop stocked hosiery, misses' wear, and cashmere shawls. His wife's cousin, George Washington Taylor, joined in 1834, and the store was named Lord & Taylor. The store continued to grow: it annexed 49 Catherine Street in 1832 and moved six years later to 61–63 Catherine Street. James S. Taylor, Lord's brother-in-law, replaced George Taylor in 1845. The company erected a new building at Grand and Chrystie Streets in 1853 and moved into that location the next year. Lord later named his son John T. Lord and his employee John S. Lyle as partners in the enterprise.

On August 29, 1859, Lord & Taylor opened a second store on Broadway at Grand Street in the modern-day SoHo neighborhood, keeping the older store open. The new store was described as a "five-story marble emporium" and was among Broadway's first major new department stores since the A.T. Stewart building at 280 Broadway was completed in 1846. At the same time, Lord & Taylor started participating in wholesaling. Lord retired in 1862. Samuel Lord Jr. and George Washington Taylor Lord succeeded the original partners in leading the company.

In 1870, the Broadway store moved uptown to a new cast-iron building at Broadway and 20th Street, in the area known as the "Ladies' Mile". This store was designed by James H. Giles and included one of the first steam-powered passenger elevators. The new store expanded around 1890 by annexing a building to the east. Lord & Taylor faced economic troubles after the Panic of 1873, though the original partners gave the company "a large loan" in 1879. By 1894 the company was fast-growing and would open stores on Fifth Avenue in 1903 and 1906. The downtown store continued to function, expanded through to Forsyth Street, and advertised until at least 1887 as a new building. Samuel Lord's estate sold the Grand Street store in 1901. 

The Lord & Taylor Building, the Starrett & van Vleck-designed Fifth Avenue store and headquarters opened between 38th and 39th streets on February 24, 1914. It touted many modern improvements, including an electric delivery vehicle garage; elevator and hidden conveyor systems for moving goods, people, showcases, and trash, and for loading and unloading trucks; and an on-site electrical generation and heating system. The Broadway store was quickly sold after the new store opened on March 26. The new store became a New York City Landmark on October 30, 2007.

Lord & Taylor announced in November 1915 that it would sell off its wholesale business.

Under Associated Dry Goods, 1916–1986
A founding unit of Associated Dry Goods, Lord & Taylor was considered to be its "crown jewel".

In 1945, Dorothy Shaver became the first woman to head a major retail establishment in the United States as president of Lord & Taylor. As vice president working with the well-known design firm of Raymond Loewy Associates, she opened what is credited as the first-ever branch store, in Manhasset, New York.  Unlike earlier forays into the suburbs that consisted of smaller boutique-style shops, this was a merchandising effort that became the model for modern suburban shopping. The store consisted of 66 individual shops. Lord & Taylor's relationship with Raymond Loewy Associates continued until 1969, following the construction of the Stamford, Connecticut store (designed by Loewy Vice President Andrew Geller). Many of Lord & Taylor's special services, including personal shoppers, were introduced while Shaver presided. During this period she introduced the Andrew Geller handwritten logo and the American Beauty Rose as icons of the store. Shaver died in 1959.

William J. Lippincott was elected chairman and chief executive in 1972. His obituary in The New York Times read: "In his years as president and chairman, Lord & Taylor moved beyond its traditional territory in the northeast to open stores in Atlanta, Houston, and Dallas and four stores in Illinois." A management shakeup ousted him in 1976.

Under the leadership of CEO Joseph E. Brooks during the 1970s, the company aggressively expanded into Texas, Illinois, and Michigan; throughout the 1980s, South Florida saw 11 stores opened in quick succession.

Under May Department Stores Company, 1986–2005
When the May Company acquired ADG in 1986, it was assumed that May bought it just for the luxury division.

The chain partially withdrew from the oil-shocked Texas and southern Florida markets in 1989–1990 after its 1986 acquisition by May.  Under May, the majority of the upscale Hahne & Co., Wanamaker's, and Woodward & Lothrop chains were refitted and converted into Lord & Taylor.

Jane T. Elfers became Lord & Taylor's second female president in June 2000. Former Neiman Marcus executive, Brendan Hoffman replaced her in October 2008, when Elfer's contract had expired. A third female president, Bonnie Brooks, took over in 2011, and a fourth female president, Liz Rodbell, took over in 2013.

Under Federated Department Stores, 2005–2006
Federated Department Stores, now Macy's Inc, acquired May Department Stores on August 30, 2005. On January 12, 2006, Federated chairman, president, and CEO Terry Lundgren announced that Lord & Taylor would be sold by the end of the year. In a move that took advantage of valuable real estate, Federated announced on March 10, 2006, that seven conflicting Lord & Taylor locations would be sold or downscale into Macy's. The legendary Center City, Philadelphia store, former flagship of the John Wanamaker chain, opened after a one-month renovation as Macy's City Center on August 1, 2006.

Under NRDC Equity Partners, 2006–2008
On June 22, 2006, NRDC Equity Partners, LLC announced it would purchase Lord & Taylor for $1.2 billion after Federated converted and sold the previously announced locations; the sale was completed in October 2006. Federated continued to service Lord & Taylor consumer credit accounts in an agreement with NRDC under the terms of its sale until mid-2007.

Under Hudson's Bay Company, 2008–2019

On July 16, 2008, NRDC Equity Partners announced that it had purchased the 338-year-old Hudson's Bay Company (HBC) for an undisclosed price, with the intention of expanding internationally and positioned Lord & Taylor under HBC. The combined HBC, as of February 2018, consisted of Hudson's Bay and Home Outfitters in Canada, Galeria Kaufhof in Germany, and Lord & Taylor and Saks Fifth Avenue in the United States.
HBC committed to spending an additional $250 million upgrading stores. The Fifth Avenue flagship store received a $150 million update in 2010. In 2011, an ultra-modern concept store opened in Westchester County at the new Ridge Hill Mall. During this time, locations such as Manhasset, Garden City, Bala Cynwyd, Eastchester, and Stamford all saw ultra-modern style renovations and upgrades. In 2012, a large branch opened at The Mall at Rockingham Park. In 2013, a contemporary style branch opened at Mizner Park in Boca Raton, Florida. In 2014, a $20 million contemporary branch, modeled after the Boca Raton location, opened at Crossgates Mall near Albany, NY. Around this time, a store was announced to open alongside Saks Fifth Avenue in the luxury wing of the American Dream Mall. In March 2017, Lord & Taylor partnered with Brideside.com to launch an in-store bridal shop.
 In April 2017, Lord & Taylor completed a $12 million renovation plan at the Fifth Avenue store. In October 2017, after an attempt made to build a skyscraper above the Fifth Avenue store, it was announced the building would be sold in a joint partnership to WeWork for $850 million. WeWork was set to occupy the uppermost floors of the building, with the rest of the building remaining a flagship space for Lord & Taylor. This was part of a trend on Wall Street to maximize profits and real estate value. In February 2019, the sale completed for $725 million in cash and the remainder in equity, forming a joint venture with Lord & Taylor as minority owners. Industry observers connected the sale of the flagship store to intense activist investors and opportunity seen to monetize real estate at HBC.

On April 1, 2018, the Hudson Bay Company gave notice of the theft of customers' credit and debit cards due to a hacking incident. A hacking group known as JokerStash or Fin7 attempted to sell the information from five million stolen customer credentials on dark web sites during the last week of March 2018. The company noted that most compromised records appeared to be from Lord & Taylor and Saks Fifth Avenue customers. The Hudson Bay Company noted that customers would not be liable for any charges incurred due to this breach, and they will offer no-cost credit report monitoring and identity protection services.

In May 2018, Walmart began carrying Lord & Taylor fashions on their website to modernize Walmart and position it upscale. This was a bold move praised by many as being innovative.

Under Le Tote, 2019–2020
In August 2019, Le Tote, Inc. purchased the retailer for C$99.5 million ($75 million) in cash on closing and an additional C$33.2 million ($25 million) two years later. HBC was to get a 25% equity stake in Le Tote.  The buyer would retain the stores' inventory, with an estimated value of C$284.2 million. The deal, expected to close before year-end, required HBC to pay the stores' rent for at least three years, at an estimated C$77 million ($58 million) cash per year. The acquisition was completed in November 2019.

In November, 2019, the sale to Le Tote was finalized and it was reported that all 38 Lord & Taylor brick-and-mortar locations would transfer ownership.

Impact of the COVID-19 pandemic
Lord & Taylor's stores were forced to close due to executive state orders by the local and state governments on non-essential retail by Wednesday, March 18, 2020, due to the COVID-19 pandemic in the United States. While it took a while for the store to reopen to the public some of its closed U.S. stores were looted following the murder of George Floyd.
Lord & Taylor began the process of reopening on Friday, May 15, 2020, with two of its locations in Florida and New Hampshire. Additional stores were gradually reopened with all stores resuming operations by July 3, 2020.
On August 2, 2020, it was reported that Lord & Taylor and Le Tote had filed for Chapter 11 bankruptcy protection due to the COVID-19 pandemic in the United States.

On August 3, it was reported that the company would simultaneously solicit bids for a going concern sale of its Le Tote and Lord & Taylor businesses. It was intended that both Le Tote and Lord & Taylor would continue to operate during the Chapter 11 process.  On Monday, October 19, 2020, Saadia Group, LLC announced it would acquire Lord & Taylor which will transition the brand into a digital collective store. The transaction was approved the following day.

On Tuesday, October 20, 2020, Lord & Taylor's brick-and-mortar stores began shuttering. On Tuesday, December 29, 2020, 18 out of 38 stores had closed and about a month later, the freestanding store in Bala Cynwyd shuttered. Finally, on Saturday, February 27, 2021, the remaining 19 stores closed; these stores would have closed on Sunday, but due to the Bergen County Blue Laws that occur on Sunday for the Westfield Garden State Plaza and Fashion Center locations both located in Paramus, New Jersey, it was decided to close all of the stores on Saturday.

Saadia Group, since 2020 
In October 2020, the investment firm Saadia Group acquired Lord & Taylor; they transitioned the brand into a digital collective store which was relaunched in April 2021. In fall 2022, an ad campaign called "Fall Fete" debuted alongside a new logo.

Saks Works 
In August 2021, it was announced that SaksWorks, a partnership with WeWork and a spinoff of the Saks Fifth Avenue brand, will provide co-working spaces for technology startups and services for other enterprises and fill about 90% of the former Lord & Taylor brick-and-mortar locations due to Hudson's Bay Company still owning the real estate of the properties. However, not every former brick-and-mortar location will get this as others were sold to different owners. 

As of December 2021 25% of the former brick-and-mortar locations are operating as Shopper's Find with Hilco Global

Logos

Gallery

References

External links

 
 Official website 

1826 establishments in New York (state)
2008 mergers and acquisitions
2019 mergers and acquisitions
Retail companies established in 1826
American companies established in 1826
Companies based in New York City
Companies that filed for Chapter 11 bankruptcy in 2020
Defunct department stores based in New York City
Hudson's Bay Company
Macy's, Inc.
May Department Stores
Midtown Manhattan
Shops in New York City